Shaw College at Detroit was an institution of higher education in Detroit that existed from 1936 until 1983.

Sources
List of Michigan colleges that have closed, changed names, etc

Educational institutions established in 1936
Defunct private universities and colleges in Michigan
1936 establishments in Michigan
1983 disestablishments in Michigan